The Pansarvärnsrobotbandvagn 551 (PvRbBv 551) was a tank destroyer developed by Landsverk and Hägglunds.

History 
When the Infanterikanonvagn 102/103 were replaced in the years 1975 to 1978 with the Infanterikanonvagn 91, the Swedish Army used their chassis as the basis for a new armoured fighting vehicle with anti-tank and anti-air variants. The Pansarvärnsrobotbandvagn 551 was the anti-tank variant while the Luftvärnsrobotvagn 701 was the anti-air variant.

Description 
The PvRbBv 551 had a new superstructure built on the old chassis. The primary armament was a BGM-71 TOW. Secondary armament was a Ksp 58 machine gun. The vehicle also had a new engine and gear similar to Bandvagn 206 installed. The vehicle was operated by a crew of four. The commander and driver are seated at the front of the vehicle. The gunner and loader are located in the middle of the hull under two large roof hatches. When the PvRbBv 551 goes into firing position, the hatches are opened and the BGM-71 TOW is raised above the vehicle roof. The gunner and loader are exposed in this position.

Production 
The work was carried out between 1984 and 1986 at Hägglund & Söner in Örnsköldsvik. 57 PvRbBv 551 was produced and served in with the Swedish Army from 1984 to 2000.

References 

Fire support vehicles
Armoured fighting vehicles of Sweden
Armoured fighting vehicles of the Cold War
Tanks of the Cold War
Tanks of Sweden
Military vehicles introduced in the 1980s